Major-General Timothy Nicholas Tyler CB is a former Quartermaster-General to the Forces.

Military career
Tim Tyler was commissioned into the Royal Electrical and Mechanical Engineers in 1972.

In 2003 he was selected to be Deputy Commander of the Iraq Survey Group, a team which had the onerous task of searching for weapons of mass destruction in Iraq.

In 2004 he was appointed Deputy Adjutant-General and in 2006 he was appointed Director-General Logistics (Land) and then Director-General Land Equipment as well as Quartermaster-General to the Forces. He retired in 2008.

He was also Colonel Commandant of the Royal Electrical and Mechanical Engineers from 1 March 2005, and the Corps of Army Music from 1 October 2005 to 31 October 2009.

References

 

|-

British Army generals
Companions of the Order of the Bath
Royal Electrical and Mechanical Engineers officers
British Army personnel of the Iraq War
Living people
Year of birth missing (living people)